The News is the only local paid-for newspaper in Portsmouth, England, and covers a wide area of south Hampshire. It is produced by Johnston Press, owners of Portsmouth Publishing & Printing, at their headquarters in North Harbour, Portsmouth, and printed in nearby Hilsea. Its official title is The News, though it was formerly known as The Portsmouth Evening News and is still popularly referred to as The Evening News despite being printed in the early hours of the morning.

The News is printed Monday to Saturday. There was also a weekly sports paper, The Sports Mail, which followed the fortunes of local club Portsmouth F.C. and local sports news. A weekend magazine and an entertainment supplement called WOW247 (formerly The Guide) are also printed. Sales have declined following price rises and the rise of social media.

Like many regional newspapers The News circulation has plummeted in recent years, slumping by 15% in the last six months of 2018 to 13,902.

History
The News began in the North East in 1873, when Samuel Storey MP founded The Echo in Sunderland. Together with six partners and an original investment of £3,500, Storey hoped to produce an evening paper that reflected his radical views.

Storey was elected into Parliament as the mayor, where he met future business partner Andrew Carnegie, a Scottish born millionaire.  The partners, along with businessman, Passmore Edwards, arrived in Portsmouth in 1883 with intentions of buying out the Hampshire Telegraph and starting a new evening newspaper, the Southern Standard.

By this time, The Evening News had already been established in Portsmouth by Graham Niven, who served as the paper's editor, manager, reporter and distributor. Both Storey and Niven faced a problem when they realised there was no room for two evening papers in Portsmouth. Niven soon sold out to Storey, retaining one quarter share.

Storey's original project, The Southern Standard only survived for eight issues. When the Storey-Carnegie syndicate broke up in 1885, Storey invested in various other papers expanding his newspaper company to West Sussex, Chichester and the Isle of Wight.

In 1903 Samuel Storey's son Frederick George took over from his father as the managing director of The Echo. When Frederick died in 1924 it was his son, also named Samuel Storey born in 1896, who was to begin the third generation of the Storey family in control of the newspaper group. The original founder of the group died in 1925.

During his 49 years as chairman of his grandfather's company, which had since become Portsmouth and Sunderland Newspapers Limited (P&SN), Lord Buckton guided the company through the technological advances of the 1950 and 1960s. Aided by his brother F.G.H Storey, P&SN explored the new processes of photo-composition and web-offset printing.

The final member of the Storey family to become chairman at the company was Sir Richard Storey, who stepped down in June 1998. Sir Stephen Waley-Cohen took over as chairman at P&SN until the company was sold to Johnston Press in July 1999. The News has since remained in the control of Johnston Press, whose slogan is "Life is Local".

In 2000 the paper launched the "We can do it" awards recognising "unsung heroes" in the community.

Offices

For many years, the newspaper was based out of offices in a former slaughterhouse in Portsmouth's Stanhope Road. In 1969, The News moved from the centre of Portsmouth to a new location in Hilsea, under the supervision of Ted Galpin, a Director and general manager (South) of P&SN. Galpin was subsequently made an OBE for his services to the newspaper industry, an honour he dedicated to his staff. When Lord Buckton died in 1978 his son Richard (who inherited his father's baronetcy) assumed the role of chairman of the company.

In 1982 an £11 million plan to develop The News Centre was announced. This hoped to provide the latest equipment for editorial, marketing, production and administration departments.

The extension was opened in 1983 by Kenelm Storey, the son of the former chairman, who became the fifth generation of the family to be involved with the company. In the following years, southern editions of a number of national newspapers have been printed at the News Centre, using the time when the presses are not needed to print evening papers.

In April 2013, The News announced it would be closing its Hilsea headquarters and moving to new offices in Portsmouth's former IBM headquarters in North Harbour. The newspaper's newsroom, advertising, newspaper sales, finance, IT, and front counter staff moved to the new headquarters in June. However, the newspaper's printing press remains at the former site.

References

External links
 

Newspapers published in Hampshire
Organisations based in Portsmouth
Daily newspapers published in the United Kingdom
Newspapers published by Johnston Press